The 2017–18 Highland Football League (known as the Press & Journal Highland League for sponsorship reasons) was the 115th season of the Highland Football League, and the 4th season as the fifth tier of the Scottish football pyramid system. The season began on 29 July 2017 and ended on 5 May 2018. Buckie Thistle were the defending champions.

The previous season's runners-up Cove Rangers won their sixth Highland Football League title after beating Clachnacuddin 5–0 on 7 April 2018. At the time, they were unbeaten with 26 wins from their 29 matches. They defeated the winners of the 2017–18 Lowland Football League (Spartans) in the League Two play-offs semi-finals, but lost to Cowdenbeath 3–2 on aggregate in the final.

Teams

All grounds are equipped with floodlights as required by league regulations.

League table

Results

Promotion play-offs

A number of postponements over the winter period resulted in fixture congestion later in the season. As a champion could not be crowned in time, the dates for the semi-finals were pushed back a week. Cove Rangers played 2017–18 Lowland Football League champions Spartans in the League Two play-off, winning 4–0 at home in the first leg. Cove went through on with a 5–2 aggregate win despite losing the second leg 2–1.

This set up a final against Cowdenbeath. The first leg at Harlaw Park finished 0–0 before Cove lost 3–2 in the second leg at Central Park, meaning that Cowdenbeath were victorious on aggregate and retained their place in League Two. Cove would remain in the Highland League.

References

Highland Football League seasons
5
Scottish